Zhu Xian, translated as Jade Dynasty or The Attack of Heaven, is a xianxia novel written by Xiao Ding. Zhu Xian creates many characters with unique personalities. The novel keeps looking for the answer to a question "What is true righteousness?" but concludes that "Heartless World, treat everything as straw dogs!", which perhaps is the main theme of the novel.

Main characters

 Zhang Xiaofan (张小凡): The male protagonist of the novel. He was born in a village called Grasstemple. When he was eleven years old, everyone in his village was killed except for him, his childhood friend Lin Jinyu, and a villager called Uncle Wang. Because of this miserable disaster, Qing Yun Faction decided to take them in. Because of his talent, Lin Jinyu was accepted as a student of a Caosong Taoist priest, the leader of Dragon-head Peak. Zhang Xiaofan had much less potential and ability than Lin Jinyu, and no masters were willing to accept him as a student except Tian Buyi, a sub-leader of Big-Bamboo Peak. However, afterwards, things began to look up. Zhang Xiaofan a had the good fortune to learn from three masters: Fu (a Buddhist), Dao (a Taoist), and Mo (a "Heretic"), and became a master of the mythical realm. At the same time, he went through a complicated relationship with two beautiful girls.
 Lu Xueqi (陆雪琪): The female protagonist of the novel. She is from the same faction as Zhang Xiaofan, the Qing Yun. It is said that she was a "fairy from the highest of heavens" and her beauty can enchant the entire country. In the novel adaptation, it was said that Lu Xueqi has had feelings for Zhang Xiaofan since he first came to the Qing Yun.
Biyao (碧瑶): The daughter of the archlord of the Ghost King faction, she is very energetic and arrogant. Because of her love for Zhang Xiaofan, she died for him by the sword Zhu Xian.

Adaptations in other media
Celestial Destroyer, 2009 Manhua
Noble Aspirations, 2016 TV series
Jade Dynasty, video game
Jade Dynasty, 2019 film
Jade Dynasty, 2022 animated series

References

 
Chinese literary works
2005 Chinese novels